Connectbeam was a company based in Mountain View, California that provided enterprise social software.  The company  provided two core services: social bookmarking and aggregation of links and metadata for content from other social software applications. The company's stated goal was to establish the enterprise social network through the integration of employees' user-generated content.

Connectbeam was founded by Puneet Gupta  in December 2005. A Series A round of $3.5 million for the company was led by Gabriel Venture Partners in July 2007.  Connectbeam sells into the global enterprise market, and has been recognized for innovation by Gartner, InformationWeek, eContent and KMWorld.

In July 2011, the Connectbeam web site was removed.

See also
 Social bookmarking
 Social network
 Enterprise social software
 Social computing

External links
 Connectbeam website

References 

Software companies based in California
Companies based in Mountain View, California
Defunct software companies of the United States